The Pedestrian is a 1973 film directed by Maximilian Schell. It is about the trial of an elderly war criminal. The film was a co-production between companies in Germany, Switzerland and Israel; the movie was distributed in the United States by Cinerama Releasing Corporation.

Cast
Gustav Rudolf Sellner - Heinz Alfred Giese
In alphabetical order:
Peggy Ashcroft - Lady Gray 
Gertrud Bald - Henriette Markowitz 
Elisabeth Bergner - Frau Lilienthal 
Lil Dagover - Frau Eschenlohr 
Käthe Haack - Frau von Rautenfeld 
Peter Hall - Rudolf Hartmann 
Ruth Hausmeister - Inge Marie Giese 
Dagmar Hirtz - Elke Giese 
Johanna Hofer - Frau Bergedorf 
Silvia Hürlimann - Hilde 
Christian Kohlund - Erwin Gotz 
Walter Kohut - Dr. Rolf Meineke 
Alexander May - Alexander Markowitz 
Herbert Mensching - Reporter 
Peter Moland - Reporter 
Françoise Rosay - Madame Dechamps   
Maximilian Schell - Andreas Giese 
Margarete Schell Noé - Frau Buchmann 
Norbert Schiller - Himself 
Walter Schmidinger - Policeman 
Franz Seitz - Dr. Karl Peters 
Manuel Sellner - Hubert Giese 
Sigfrit Steiner - Auditor 
Walter Varndal - Dr. Kratxer 
Gila von Weitershausen - Karin 
Elsa Wagner - Elsa Giese

Awards
The film was nominated for the Academy Award for Best Foreign Language Film at the 46th Academy Awards. It was also nominated for Best Foreign Language Film by the U.S. National Board of Review.

See also
 List of submissions to the 46th Academy Awards for Best Foreign Language Film
 List of German submissions for the Academy Award for Best Foreign Language Film

References

External links

1973 films
1973 drama films
Swiss drama films
German drama films
Israeli drama films
West German films
1970s French-language films
1970s German-language films
Films directed by Maximilian Schell
Films set in West Germany
Films about journalism
Films about war crimes
Best Foreign Language Film Golden Globe winners
Films scored by Manos Hatzidakis
Films produced by Zev Braun
French-language Swiss films
1970s English-language films
1970s German films